Cleireach mac Ceadach (died 820) was King of Uí Fiachrach Aidhne, Ireland.

References
 Irish Kings and High-Kings, Francis John Byrne (2001), Dublin: Four Courts Press, 
 CELT: Corpus of Electronic Texts at University College Cork

People from County Galway
9th-century Irish monarchs
820 deaths
Year of birth unknown